The 2017 Atlantic Coast Conference football season was the 65th season of College Football play for the Atlantic Coast Conference (ACC). It was played from August 31, 2017 to January 1, 2018. The Atlantic Coast Conference consisted of 14 members in two divisions. It was part of the 2017 NCAA Division I FBS football season.  The entire 2017 schedule was released on January 24, 2017.  The defending ACC Champions were the Clemson Tigers.  The Atlantic Division regular season champions were Clemson, and the Coastal Division regular season champions were Miami. The 2017 ACC Championship Game was played on December 2, 2017, in Charlotte, North Carolina. Clemson defeated Miami by a score of 38–3.

Preseason

ACC Media days

Preseason Poll
The 2017 ACC Preseason Poll was announced following the ACC Football Kickoff meetings in Charlotte, North Carolina on July 13–14. Florida State and Miami were selected to win the Atlantic Division and Coastal Division, respectively. Lamar Jackson of Louisville was voted the Preseason ACC Player of the Year.  It was voted on by 167 media members, all of which were in attendance for the ACC Football Kickoff.

ACC Championship Votes

 Florida State – 118
 Clemson – 35
 Louisville – 7
 Virginia Tech – 3
 Miami – 3
 Duke – 1

Atlantic Division
 Florida State – 1,108 (121 First place votes) 
 Clemson – 1,007 (37) 
 Louisville – 843 (9) 
 NC State – 658
 Wake Forest – 415
 Syracuse – 362
 Boston College – 283

Coastal Division
 Miami – 1,065 (103)
 Virginia Tech – 932 (40)
 Georgia Tech – 708 (9)
 Pittsburgh – 673 (7)
 North Carolina – 606 (4)
 Duke – 473 (4)
 Virginia – 219

Preseason ACC Player of the year

 Lamar Jackson, LOU – 113
 Deondre Francois, FSU – 23
 Christian Wilkins, CLEM – 11
 Harold Landry, BC – 8
 Jaylen Samuels, NCST – 7
 Eric Dungey, CUSE–- 2
 Shaquille Quarterman MIA, Ahmmon Richards MIA, Daniel Jones, DUKE  – 1

Preseason All Conference Teams

Offense

Defense

Specialist

Source:

Recruiting classes

Coaches

Note: Stats shown are before the beginning of the season

Rankings

Schedule

† denotes Homecoming game

Regular season

Week 1

Week 2

|-bgcolor="#F2F2F2"
| September 9
| 2:30 p.m.
| #16 Miami
| Arkansas State
| Centennial Bank Stadium • Jonesboro, AR
| 
| Canceled
| 
|-≈

|-≈

The game between Arkansas State and Miami was canceled due to the wake of Hurricane Irma due to travel concerns for the Hurricanes.
The game between Florida State and Louisiana-Monroe, originally scheduled for 7:00 p.m., was moved up to 12:00 p.m. in advance of the arrival of Hurricane Irma, and later cancelled due to inclement weather.

Week 3

|-bgcolor="#F2F2F2"
| September 16
| 
| Georgia Tech
| UCF
| Spectrum Stadium • Orlando, FL
| 
| Canceled
| 
|-≈

The game between Georgia Tech and UCF was canceled due to the wake of Hurricane Irma due to UCF using their stadium for recovery efforts.

Week 4

Week 5

Week 6

The game between Florida State and Miami, originally scheduled to be played on September 16, was moved to October 7 due to the effects of Hurricane Irma.

Week 7

Week 8

Week 9

Week 10

Week 11

Week 12

Week 13

Championship game

Week 14 (2017 ACC Championship Game)

ACC vs other conferences

ACC vs Power 5 matchups
This is a list of the power conference teams (Big 10, Big 12, Pac-12, Notre Dame and SEC). Although the NCAA does not consider BYU a "Power Five" school, the ACC considers games against BYU as satisfying its "Power Five" scheduling requirement. The ACC plays in the non-conference games. All rankings are from the current AP Poll at the time of the game.

Records against other conferences
2017 records against non-conference foes (as of January 2, 2018):

Regular Season

Post Season

Postseason

Bowl games

Rankings are from CFP rankings.  All times Eastern Time Zone.  ACC teams shown in bold.

Awards and honors

Player of the week honors

All-conference teams

First Team

Second Team

Third Team

ACC Individual Awards
 

ACC Player of the Year
 Lamar Jackson, Louisville
 
ACC Rookie of the Year
  A. J. Dillon, Boston College 
 
ACC Coach of the Year
 Mark Richt, Miami
 

ACC Offensive Player of the Year
 Lamar Jackson, Louisville
 
ACC Offensive Rookie of the Year
 A. J. Dillon, Boston College 
 
Jacobs Blocking Trophy
 Mitch Hyatt, Clemson
 

ACC Defensive Player of the Year
 Bradley Chubb, NC State
 
ACC Defensive Rookie of the Year
 Brenton Nelson, Virginia

All-Americans

Consensus

Unanimous selection: Bradley Chubb - NC State

Associated Press

 AP First Team: 
Bradley Chubb - NC State, 
Clelin Ferrell - Clemson,
 AP Second Team: 
Lamar Jackson - Louisville, 
Mitch Hyatt - Clemson,
Christian Wilkins - Clemson,
Dorian O'Daniel - Clemson,
Derwin James - Florida State,
 AP Third Team: 
Tyrone Crowder - Clemson,
Jaylen Samuels - NC State,
Steve Ishmael - Syracuse,
Austin Bryant - Clemson,
Micah Kiser - Virginia,
Tremaine Edmunds - Virginia Tech,
Quin Blanding - Virginia,

Walter Camp

Walter Camp First Team:
Bradley Chubb - NC State
Walter Camp Second Team:
Steve Ishmael - Syracuse, 
Mitch Hyatt - Clemson, 
Lamar Jackson - Louisville, 
Austin Bryant - Clemson, 
Christian Wilkins - Clemson, 
Micah Kiser - Virginia, 
Joe Giles-Harris - Duke, 
Derwin James - Florida State, 
Quin Blanding - Virginia, 
Lukas Denis - Boston College

FWAA

FWAA First Team:
Bradley Chubb - NC State,
Austin Bryant - Clemson,
Derwin James - Florida State,

FWAA Second Team:
Lamar Jackson - Louisville,
Steve Ishmael - Syracuse,
Mitch Hyatt - Clemson,
Clelin Ferrell - Clemson,
Micah Kiser - Virginia,
Quin Blanding - Virginia,

National Award Winners
Bronko Nagurski Trophy – Bradley Chubb - Defensive End, NC State
Broyles Award - Tony Elliott - Co-Offensive Coordinator, Clemson
Walter Camp Coach of the Year Award - Mark Richt - Head Coach, Miami
Campbell Trophy - Micah Kiser - Linebacker, Virginia

Home game attendance

Bold – Exceeded capacity
†Season High

NFL Draft

There were a total of 45 athletes from the Atlantic Coast Conference selected in the 2018 NFL Draft.  This was the second most from a single conference in the draft, and the third most from the ACC all–time.  Georgia Tech was the only member university to not have a player drafted.

References